Moroto–Nakapiripirit Road is a road in the Northern Region of Uganda. The road  connects the towns of Moroto, the largest town in the Karamoja sub-region, and Nakapiripirit in the same sub-region.

Location
The coordinates of the road near Lorengedwat are 2°20'48.0"N, 34°35'27.0"E (Latitude:2.346667; Longitude:34.5908331).

Upgrading to bitumen
Beginning with the 2011/2012 national budget, road became one of those planned to be upgraded from gravel to bituminous surface. With political pressure from the Karamoja parliamentary caucus, the road was prioritized in the 2013/2014 financial year. On 12 November 2013, President Yoweri Museveni commissioned the start of construction. The China Road and Bridge Construction Corporation, a subsidiary of the China Communications Construction Company, was awarded the contract for the  road at a cost of US$80 million (USh:184 billion at that time), fully funded by the Ugandan government. The road is expected to be ready during the first half of 2016.

See also
 Moroto District
 Nakapiripirit District
 Economy of Uganda
 List of roads in Uganda

References

External links
 Uganda National Road Authority Homepage
 Ugandan Government Increases Road Network Funding

 

Roads in Uganda
Moroto District
Nakapiripirit District
Karamoja
Northern Region, Uganda
Road infrastructure in Uganda
Road infrastructure in Africa
Transport infrastructure in Uganda
Transport infrastructure in Africa